Oman Air serves the following scheduled destinations as of June 2022:

List

References

Lists of airline destinations